The Kenai Peninsula (Dena'ina: Yaghenen) is a large peninsula jutting from the coast of Southcentral Alaska. The name Kenai is derived from the word "Kenaitze" or "Kenaitze Indian Tribe", the name of the Native Athabascan Alaskan tribe, the Kahtnuht’ana Dena’ina ("People along the Kahtnu (Kenai River)"), who historically inhabited the area. They called the Kenai Peninsula Yaghanen ("the good land").

Geography

It is separated from the mainland on the west by Cook Inlet and on the east by Prince William Sound. Most of the peninsula is part of the Kenai Peninsula Borough. Athabaskan and Alutiiq Native groups lived on the peninsula for thousands of years prior to Gerasim Izmailov becoming the first European to explore and map the area in 1789.

The glacier-covered Kenai Mountains, rising , run along the southeast spine of the peninsula along the coast of the Gulf of Alaska. Much of the range is within Kenai Fjords National Park. The northwest coast along the Cook Inlet is flatter and marshy, dotted with numerous small lakes. Several larger lakes extend through the interior of the peninsula, including Skilak Lake and Tustumena Lake.  Rivers include the Kenai River, famous for its salmon population, and its tributary, the Russian River, the Kasilof River, and the Anchor River. Kachemak Bay, a small inlet off the larger Cook Inlet, extends into the peninsula's southwest end, much of which is part of Kachemak Bay State Park.

The Kenai Peninsula has many glaciers in its eastern and southern areas. It is home to both the Sargent Icefield and Harding Icefields and numerous glaciers that spawn off them.

Towns and cities
The peninsula includes several of the most populous towns in Southcentral Alaska, including Seward on the Gulf of Alaska Coast, Soldotna, Kenai, Sterling, and Cooper Landing along the Cook Inlet and Kenai River, and Homer, along Kachemak Bay, along with numerous smaller villages and settlements.

Transportation
Homer famously marks the terminus of the paved highway system of North America and is a popular destination for travelers who have driven to Alaska from the lower 48 states. Seward is the southern terminus of the Alaska Railroad. Airports with regularly scheduled flights are in Kenai and Homer, as well as smaller general-aviation airports in Soldotna and Seward. The Seward Highway connects Seward to Anchorage, and the Sterling Highway is the backbone of Kenai Peninsula connecting the larger towns to Anchorage.

Climate
The peninsula' coastal climate is relatively mild, with abundant rainfall. It is one of the few areas in Alaska that allow for agriculture, with a growing season adequate for producing hay and several other crops.

Natural resources and economy
The peninsula also has natural gas, petroleum, and coal deposits, as well as abundant commercial and personal-use fisheries. Tourism is a major industry, along with outfitting and guiding services for hunters and fishers. The Kenai Peninsula is known as "Alaska's Playground". Kenai National Wildlife Refuge encompasses nearly two million acres of the peninsula.

References

Landforms of Kenai Peninsula Borough, Alaska
Peninsulas of Alaska
Regions of Alaska
Landforms of Chugach Census Area, Alaska
Kenai Mountains-Turnagain Arm National Heritage Area
Kenai Fjords National Park
Denaʼina